The Year of the Dog is a 1994 Russian drama film directed by Semyon Aranovich. It was entered into the 44th Berlin International Film Festival where it won the Silver Bear for an outstanding artistic contribution.

Plot
Former criminal Sergei meets Vera - an elderly unhappy woman who lives in a dormitory. After Sergei commits another crime, they run together and along the way they accidentally get into a zone contaminated by radiation. Sergei decides to stay there, but Vera does not leave him. At that moment three looters come to the territory.

Cast
 Inna Churikova as Vera
 Igor Sklyar as Sergej
 Aleksandr Feklistov
 Era Ziganshina
 Mikhail Dorofeyev
 Sergei Bobrov
 Gennadi Menshikov
 Valentina Kovel
 Robert Vaab
 Diana Shishlyayeva
 Irina Polyanskaya
 Dmitri Kruglov
 Tatyana Zakharova
 Marina Yuldasheva
 Viktor Sukhorukov

References

External links

1994 films
1990s Russian-language films
1994 drama films
Films directed by Semyon Aranovich
Silver Bear for outstanding artistic contribution
Russian drama films